Lithosphere (2005) is a collaborative album by electronic musicians Robert Rich and Ian Boddy. Like their previous collaboration Outpost, this album was released as a limited edition of 2000 copies.

Track listing
”Threshold” – 2:07
”Vent” – 5:20
”Chamber” – 6:29
”Glass” – 3:40
”Subduction” – 5:34
”Geode” – 6:32
”Stone” – 3:51
”Metamorphic” – 7:25
”Lithosphere” – 6:29
”Melt” – 5:15

Personnel
Robert Rich – MOTM modular synthesizer, TimewARP2600, samples and scrapes, lap steel guitar
Ian Boddy – NI Reaktor, Logic Pro Ultrabeat, EXS24, EVB3, VSL Glass, Stones, strings and woodwind samples, rocks

External links
album feature from Robert Rich’s official web site

Robert Rich (musician) albums
2005 albums